"Pass at Me" is a single from American hip-hop producer Timbaland. The song features vocals from American rapper Pitbull, also features production by French DJ David Guetta. It was released via digital download on September 13, 2011 in the United States, and received a full release across Europe on the weekend of October 7, 2011.

Background 
The song was first announced in August 2011, following Timbaland ceasing releasing free music via his Timbo Thursdays promotion. It was suggested at the time that the track would not be released until December 2011, due to Shock Value III not being released until the new year. However, on September 12, 2011, Timbaland announced that the track would appear on the American iTunes store from midnight on September 13. Subsequently, downloads of the single resulted in it debuting at number 23 on the Bubbling Under Hot 100 chart. It later reached number 4 on that chart. The single was released to European radio on the same date, subsequently appearing on airplay charts in Poland and Slovakia. On September 20, 2011, the single was released in Australia, peaking at number 89 on the ARIA Singles Chart. The single received a full release across Europe on October 7, 2011, and was released in the United Kingdom on October 10, 2011. "Pass at Me" impacted urban radio in the US on September 13, 2011. It impacted top 40/mainstream and rhythmic radio on November 8, 2011.

Music video 
The music video was released onto Timbaland's official VEVO channel on September 21, 2011, and was available exclusively to stream in the United States and Australia, before being released worldwide on September 24. The video features Pitbull on a boat, surrounded by girls dressed in Playboy outfits, while Timbaland is seen dancing at the top of a swimming pool at a mansion, similarly, surrounded by Playboy bunnies. The video continues like so until the third and final chorus, where the pair meet up at a party, of which David Guetta is the DJ, and such, the trio perform the last section of the song together.

As of February 2020, the video has received over 33 million views on YouTube.

Remix 
The official remix was made with the Puerto Rican duo Wisin & Yandel.

Formats and track listings 
 Digital Download
 "Pass at Me" (Explicit) – 4:10
 "Pass at Me" (Spanish Remix) – 4:20

 CD Single
 "Pass at Me" (Clean Radio Edit) – 4:07
 "Pass at Me" (Explicit) – 4:10

 Remixes – EP
 "Pass at Me" (Tommy Trash Remix) – 5:22
 "Pass at Me" (Junior Sanchez Remix) – 7:02
 "Pass at Me" (Tim Mason Remix) – 5:32
 "Pass at Me" (Genetix Remix) – 5:11

Chart performance

Release history

References 

Timbaland songs
2011 songs
Pitbull (rapper) songs
Song recordings produced by Timbaland
Interscope Records singles
Songs written by Attitude (rapper)
Songs written by Timbaland
Songs written by Pitbull (rapper)
Songs written by Giorgio Tuinfort
Songs written by David Guetta
Song recordings produced by David Guetta